The Torneo Regional del Litoral – Primera División is an annual rugby union competition in Argentina. The tournament is contested by clubs from the Rosario, Santa Fe and Entre Ríos Unions, and is one of several regional competitions held in Argentina every year.

The tournament was first held in 1929, with Atlético del Rosario winning the first title. The Regional del Litoral runs from May to July.

Nowadays, the Top 10 is the main division of the Litoral Tournament, which is composed of three levels on pyramid, with the "Primera División" as the second level and "Segunda División" as the third division.

Format 
The competition is open to all clubs from the Rosario, Santa Fe, and Entre Ríos Unions, depending on their rankings the previous season. As founding member of the Buenos Aires Union (URBA), Rosario's oldest club (Atlético del Rosario) takes part in the Torneo de la URBA and does not participate in the Litoral tournament.

Ten teams participate in the first stage of the tournament (Top 10), with the eight best placed qualifying to play the "Zona Campeonato". and ten clubs playing the "Zona Reubicación", made up of the two teams worst placed in Top 10 plus other eight clubs.

The champion and runner-up of Torneo del Litoral qualify for the Nacional de Clubes, the main club competition of Argentina while the other best placed teams qualify for Torneo del Interior, the national club competition outside Buenos Aires.

Clubs 
Teams participating in Primera División (as of February 2023):

List of champions

Results 

Notes

Titles by club

References

External links 
 

Rugby union leagues in Argentina
1929 establishments in Argentina